Snuff Box (sometimes referred to as Berry & Fulcher's Snuff Box) is a British dark sitcom set in London. Starring and written by Matt Berry and Rich Fulcher with additional material by Nick Gargano, it aired on BBC Three in 2006. The series was directed by Brass Eye director Michael Cumming who later directed Berry's Toast of London.

Starring as fictionalized versions of themselves, Berry plays a hangman ("High Executioner to the King of England"), and Fulcher his assistant. The majority of the programme is set in a "gentlemen's club for hangmen", although the show is also interspersed with sequences of sketches, often featuring different characters. The show is set in "no particular time" with deliberately anachronistic sets.

Background  
Berry and Fulcher met whilst working together on another BBC Three comedy, The Mighty Boosh. Snuff Box was originally titled Berry & Fulcher's Comedy Bronze.

Reception  
The Guardian described the show as "fantastically dark and cynical".

DVD release  
The DVD was released on 16 June 2008.

On 11 October 2011, Severin Films released the series on DVD with a bonus CD of music and other exclusive extra features in the North American market.

Episodes
This list is ordered by the original air dates on BBC Three in the United Kingdom.

Music
The Snuff Box theme is used repeatedly throughout the series. Matt Berry composed the music, both themes and incidental. He sang most of the vocal parts and played most of the instruments. He recorded the theme tune in his flat. English composer Tony Hatch advised Berry on the brass sections.

The film Dredd featured the Snuff Box theme in a few scenes.

References

External links

2006 British television series debuts
2006 British television series endings
2000s British black comedy television series
2000s British comedy television series
BBC black comedy television shows
English-language television shows
Television shows set in London